Dorinda Grace Clark-Cole (born Dorinda Grace Clark; October 19, 1957) is an American Grammy Award-winning gospel singer, songwriter, musician, talk show host, and evangelist. Clark–Cole is best known as a member of family vocal group The Clark Sisters and as a daughter of pioneering choral director Mattie Moss Clark. As a member of The Clark Sisters, Clark–Cole has won two Grammy Awards. She is known to the music world as the "Rose of Gospel Music".

Biography

Early life
Clark–Cole was born on October 19, 1957, and raised in Detroit, Michigan, to the late Elbert and Dr. Mattie Moss-Clark. Clark–Cole began singing at an early age with her sisters Karen, Twinkie, Jacky, and Denise. The sisters sang in their father's church and usually performed songs written and composed by their mother. Clark-Cole, a soprano is referred to as the "jazzy sister" of the group, helped develop what is known as "The Clark Sound", which often features high and fast melismas, riffs, runs, scats, and soulful growls. Clark–Cole attributes her fiery, convicting singing style to her mother, who saw the gift of singing and preaching in her at an early age. Back in the 1960s and 1970s, when other children their age were playing outside, Clark–Cole and her sisters had to work on their familial harmonies.

Clark–Cole says, "We made a lot of sacrifices.  My mom was a stickler for making sure we rehearsed before we went out to perform. She saw the gifts and talents within us and started shaping and molding us. She taught us discipline along with how to use our gifts." Clark sang lead on "Overdose of the Holy Ghost", as well as on "My Redeemer Liveth", the B-side to The Clark Sisters' biggest single "You Brought the Sunshine".

Recording career
Clark-Cole's self-titled solo debut, Dorinda Clark-Cole, released in June 2002 on Gospo Centric Records/Zomba Label Group, won two Stellar Awards and a Soul Train Lady of Soul Award. The album featured the hit single "I'm Coming Out". Her second album, The Rose of Gospel, was released under the same label in August 2005. The album debuted in Billboards top 5 on the Gospel charts and garnered a Grammy Nomination for the Best Traditional Soul Gospel album and won 2007 and 2009 Stellar Award for the Best Female Artist of the Year. The live portions of both albums were produced by Asaph Ward.

After being pushed back from a prematurely stated date in late 2007, Clark–Cole's third solo album, also released on Gospo Centric Records/ Zomba Label Group, Take It Back, was released on April 15, 2008. Producers Alex "Asaph" Ward, PAJAM, and Rodney Jerkins contributed to the project. In 2009, Dorinda released a six-song (EP) album entitled In The Face of Change on September 21. It included hit songs such as "Change" written by her son Jay Cole and "BAMM" which was a "Verizon Select". Released on her own ministry label, "Harvestime Ministries", the album was never heard of until she announced it the day of its release. A video on YouTube has a preview of all of the new songs on the record.
Another solo project, I Survived, was released in August 2011 under a new label, Light Records. The project also contains duet titled "Thank You" with her sister, Twinkie Clark. Clark–Cole was featured on the title track of Kirk Franklin's Hero album. In early 2009, Clark–Cole performed "Nothing but the Truth" for the Sojourner Truth unveiling on Capitol Hill for First Lady Michelle Obama and other officials. As a member of the Clark Sisters, Clark–Cole won three Grammys in 2008. Live – One Last Time won the Best Traditional Gospel Album. Its album track, "Blessed & Highly Favored", won the Best Gospel Performance as well as the individual Best Gospel Song. With the group she appeared nationally on The Tonight Show with Jay Leno, ABC's The View, Bobby Jones Gospel, Lift Every Voice, Gospel Superfest, TBN's Praise the Lord, The Stellar Awards and The Lady of Soul Awards.

Personal and religious life
Clark-Cole has been evangelizing and making speaking engagements annually for over 20 years, along with her singing career and being a wife and mother. Clark–Cole married Gregory Cole on December 2, 1978 and together they now have 2 children, Nikkia Cole-Beach and Gregory "Jay" Cole Jr. Dr. Cole also has two grandchildren. Clark–Cole ministers nationally as well as internationally in countries such as England, Japan, Germany, France, Korea and South Africa. She made history in South Africa, having been the first woman to minister in the pulpit to over 4,000 people. Clark-Cole is a staple in the Church of God in Christ of which she is a licensed National Evangelist, Assistant State Mother for the Michigan North Central Ecclesiastical Jurisdiction, and in 2016, was appointed by Bishop Charles E. Blake as the Elect Lady of the COGIC's International Evangelism Department. She taught at the Clark Conservatory of Music in Detroit and is an administrator of ministry at the Greater Emmanuel Institutional COGIC.

Clark-Cole's preaching ministry has also gained interest within academic spaces. According to scholar of religion Ashon Crawley, By attending to the Black Pentecostal aesthetics of whooping found in Clark-Cole's "Why Do I Come Back for More" sermon, Clark-Cole's homily is examined as producing the worship space as a discontinuous and open sonic space, open to the other voices that both proceeded her moment of being overcome with Spirit -such that other women gathered around, held and hugged her -and extended the preacherly moment by sociality, through opening up and diffusing the very grounds for the concept, for preaching, for listening, for breathing. Crawley would go on to offer a reading of Clark-Cole's whooping that places the fundamental quality of such aesthetic sociality, not in the fact that it can be shared but in the fact that it must be shared by all, for vitality, for life. This sharing in and as commons, Crawley argues, enacts violence against any form of marginalization or oppression.

Other career ventures and accomplishments
Clark–Cole is the new host of TCT Network's Dorinda Show, co-host of TCT's Celebrate on the Road, former Stellar Awards host, guest judge on Verizon's "How Sweet The Sound" national televised competition, and the former spokes-model for Donna Vinci Clothing, and her "Rose Collection" is now distributed by Terra Mina Fashions. She has since partnered with MR. SONG, a fashion designer of Detroit, in creating The Bloom Collection, a couture collection of hat adorning accessories. She is national radio host of Serving Up Soul with Dorinda Clark Cole which syndicates to 50 affiliated radio stations. She is also the Founder and CEO of Lifeline Productions Inc., which holds an annual Singers & Musicians Conference. Through this conference it is her goal to educate a new generation of ministers of the importance of "keeping ministry in the music" by offering various activities including daily workshops and evening worship services featuring from artists whose ministries have gone beyond ministering in song. In September 2004 she received an honorary Doctorate of Divinity from Mt. Carmel Theological Seminary of Fresno, California.

Clark–Cole says that if she did not have a career in music that she would be "dancing on Broadway", and her dream would be "to sing with Bette Midler, Cher and Celine Dion". She is currently represented by Keith Douglas, CEO of RKD Music Management in Los Angeles, California.

Discography

Solo Albums

Collaborative Albums

Extended plays

Singles

As a lead artist

As featured artist

Guest appearances
 "Hero (featuring Dorinda Clark Cole)" – Kirk Franklin (from Hero)
 "Tis So Sweet" – Dorinda Clark Cole (from Build A Bridge)
 "Higher Ground" – Missy Elliott, Karen Clark Sheard, Kim Burrell, Mary Mary, Dorinda Clark Cole, and Yolanda Adams (from Miss E... So Addictive) (Elektra, 2001)
 "It Will All Be Worth It" – Mary Mary feat. Gospel Legends (from The Sound)
 "I'm Wrapped in You (featuring Dorinda Clark Cole)" – Bishop Eddie L. Long (from The Kingdom, Vol. 1 (feat. GW's))
 "Still Mighty, Still Strong (feat. Dorinda Clark Cole)" – Youthful Praise, Resting on His Promise (2009)
 "This is That" & "Luke 5" (Feat. Dorinda Clark Cole) – (Robi Rivers Presents The Voices of Calvary, LIVE 2015, Rivers of Melody Music Label)
 "Who's On The Lord's Side" (Feat. Dorinda Clark Cole)  – Byron Cage, Malaaco 50th Anniversary 2018, Malaaco Records)

Videography

Filmography
 The Marriage Lover (2011)
 The Dorinda Show (2008–present)
 How Sweet The Sound (2009)
 The Gospel According to Dorinda (2014–present)

Awards

BET Awards

The BET Awards are awarded annually by the Black Entertainment Television network. Dorinda Clark-Cole has received 2 nominations.

Dove Awards

The Dove Awards are awarded annually by the Gospel Music Association. Dorinda Clark-Cole has won 2 awards from 10 nominations.

Grammy Awards

The Grammy Awards are awarded annually by the National Academy of Recording Arts and Sciences. Dorinda Clark-Cole has won 2 awards from 10 nominations.

NAACP Image Awards

The NAACP Image Awards are awarded annually by the National Association for the Advancement of Colored People (NAACP). Dorinda Clark-Cole has won 2 awards from 4 nominations.

Soul Train Awards
The Soul Train Music Awards are awarded annually. Dorinda Clark-Cole has received 1 award.

Stellar Awards
The Stellar Awards are awarded annually by SAGMA. Dorinda Clark-Cole has received 12 awards and 1 honorary award.

References

External links
Dorinda Clark Cole Official Site

1957 births
Living people
African-American Christians
American gospel singers
Singers from Detroit
American evangelists
Women evangelists
American Pentecostals
21st-century American singers
20th-century American singers
Members of the Church of God in Christ
21st-century American women singers
20th-century American women singers
African-American women musicians